The 1954 FIFA World Cup qualification Group 5 contained Austria and Portugal.

Table

Matches

 

Austria qualified.

Team stats

Head coach:  Walter Nausch

Head coach:  Salvador do Campo

References

External links
FIFA official page
RSSSF – 1954 World Cup Qualification
Allworldcup

5
1953–54 in Portuguese football
qual